Trichaptum abietinum is a species of poroid fungus in the order Hymenochaetales. It is saprophytic, growing from dead conifer wood.

The white-gray cap is 1–4 cm wide and usually no more than .5 thick, shelved and fanlike, with brownish and leathery flesh. The spores are white, cylindrical, and smooth.

The species is inedible.

Similar species include Trichaptum biforme, Bjerkandera adusta, and Trametes versicolor.

References

External links
Trichaptum abietinum at Index Fungorum

Hymenochaetales
Fungi described in 1793
Fungi of Europe
Inedible fungi
Taxa named by James Dickson (botanist)